The Brazil Union is a liberal-conservative political party in Brazil. The party was founded on 6 October 2021 from a merger between the Democrats (DEM) and the Social Liberal Party (PSL). The merger resulted in the biggest party in Brazil, and was approved by Brazil's Superior Electoral Court on 8 February 2022.

The party is generally split on opposition to Jair Bolsonaro and is most often in opposition to the policies of Luiz Inácio Lula da Silva, nominating Soraya Thronicke for president in 2022 Brazilian general election.  In 2022, it was reported the party is in talks with the Progressistas to form the largest block in Congress, forming a party that could dictate presidential policy. The party has formed alliances with both Bolsonaro's Liberal Party, as in the 2022 Ceará gubernatorial election, and selectively with the Worker's Party, as with Fernando Haddad in the 2022 São Paulo gubernatorial election.

History

Prelude to the merger
Historically, the Democrats were one of the largest parties on the Brazilian right, being the successor of the Liberal Front Party (PFL), a descendent of the military dictatorship governist party National Renewal Alliance (ARENA), while the PSL was historically a small social-liberal party, but with the election of Jair Bolsonaro as President started to position itself as a more socially conservative and economically liberal party.

In 2017, Constitutional Amendment 97 was enacted, which established a progressive barrier clause, with that Brazilian political parties have free access to radio and television in electoral campaigns, as well federal funds. Likewise, the amendment prohibited the formation of political coalitions to contest proportional elections. The purpose of the amendment was to reduce the number of political parties in Brazil.

The first news that emerged proposing the merger was at the end of 2019, during the crisis that culminated in the departure of Jair Bolsonaro from the PSL along with many of his core supporters and by the departure of several historical members of DEM, such as mayor of the city of Rio de Janeiro Eduardo Paes, the former president of the Chamber Rodrigo Maia and the vice governor of the state of São Paulo Rodrigo Garcia, in addition to bad election results of PSL in the municipal elections.  

At the time, there was opposition, with ACM Neto, president of Democratas, stating that this union would be meaningless and Felipe Francischini, president of the Constitution and Justice Commission in the Chamber of Deputies, saying that the union would make both parties lose space in politics.

Since then, some political parties merged with others. Using this precedent, in 2021, the Social Liberal Party (PSL) and Democrats announced the upcoming merger.

Merger formalized and departure of Bolsonaro wing
The name along with the TSE number 44 was chosen at the end of September 2021. The merger was agreed upon on 6 October 2021 by an acclamation on a national convention containing representatives from both parties, and was legally approved by the Superior Electoral Court on 8 February 2022.

In the 2018 elections, the predecessor parties (DEM and PSL) elected 81 federal deputies, so that, on the date of the merger, the party had the largest number of members in the Chamber of Deputies. With the merger however, more core Bolsonaro supporters left the party for the Liberal Party and the Progressistas, given that the party wanted to run its own presidential candidate. In April 2022, the party had 46 members in the Chamber of Deputies, ranking fifth among the parties in the House.

2022 general elections 
Committing to its attempt to nominate a presidential candidate in the 2022 Brazilian general election, the party nominated Soraya Thronicke, a lawyer and senator from Mato Grasso do Sul, as their presidential candidate and Marcos Cintra, an economist and federal deputy for São Paulo, as vice-president. While Thronicke was not elected, the party itself won the gubernatorial race on Amazonas, Goiás, Mato Grosso and Rondônia. On parliamentary elections they also had success, electing 59 Federal Deputies and 7 Senators. One of them was former Operation Car Wash lead judge Sergio Moro, elected as a Senator for Paraná.

Lula administration 

The party accepted 3 ministry posts in the Lula government. Luciano Bivar announced that the party would not be in opposition to the new government, but neither would be part of the governist base, despite the three ministry posts.

Ideology 

Brazil Union is positioned centre-right on the political spectrum.  Political scientist Vinícius Vieira describes the merger as being a Brazilian version of liberal parties, being focused on capitalizing on the right-wing electorate who have become disillusioned with President Jair Bolsonaro.  PSL vice president Junior Bozzella placed the new party as part of the democratic pole and which seeks to avoid political polarization between Luiz Inácio Lula da Silva and Jair Bolsonaro, stating that radical Bolsonaro supporters would have to leave the party.

At the foundation, a manifesto was defined that affirms the political positions of Brazil Union, with its four guidelines:

 The value of democracy as a political system based on tolerance, plurality, respect and dialogue;
 The value of the State as guarantor of the population's basic social rights;
 The value of freedom as a condition for seeking individual fulfillment;
 The value of the family as the mainstay of the person and the basis of society.

The manifesto also defined 44 basic principles of the party. In economics, although advocating fiscal austerity, privatization and tax cuts, the party is against the minimal state, stating that the state has an important role in areas such as education, health and income transfer programs.  On social issues, it positions itself as favorable to the preservation of the Brazilian family and culture, also defending the increase in the participation of women and racial minorities in politics. Furthermore, it states that the existence of climate change is evident and that the government must take immediate action to mitigate this, becoming one of first decidedly pro-business parties to do so.

Notable members 
 Luciano Bivar, former national president of the Social Liberal Party, Federal Deputy for Pernambuco, and candidate for president in 2006
 Ronaldo Caiado, former Federal Deputy, former Senator, Governor of Goiás, and candidate for president in 1989
 Clarissa Garotinho, daughter of Anthony Garotinho, former city councilor, and Federal Deputy for Rio de Janeiro
 Kim Kataguiri, YouTube personality, anti-Dilma activist, and Federal Deputy for São Paulo
 ACM Neto, former national president of the Democrats, general secretary of Brazil Union, and former Mayor of Salvador
 Sergio Moro, ex-federal judge, pre-candidate for president, and chief investigator in Operation Car Wash
 Soraya Thronicke, businesswoman, Senator for Mato Grasso do Sul, and candidate for president in 2022
 Capitão Wagner, military captain, former city councilor for Fortaleza, and Federal Deputy for Ceará
 Daniela Carneiro, incumbent Minister of Tourism, wife of Wagner dos Santos Carneiro, and former Federal Deputy for Rio de Janeiro

Electoral results

Presidential election

Legislative election

References

Political parties established in 2021
Conservative parties in Brazil
2021 establishments in Brazil